Vlinder Guyot (also known as Alba Seamount) is a guyot in the Western Pacific Ocean. Vlinder Guyot has noticeable rift zones, including an older and lower volcano to the northwest and Oma Vlinder seamount south.

Vlinder Guyot formed about 95 million years ago, presumably as a consequence of hotspot volcanism. The volcanic island became an atoll with active reefs that eventually drowned in the Albian-Cenomanian, although renewed volcanic activity until the Miocene sometimes sustained shallow water environments. The guyot is currently settled by numerous types of animals and is part of an area leased for mining purposes.

Name 

The seamount is officially known as Alba Guyot, after Francisco Alba, companion of Ferdinand Magellan. Other names are Dalmorgeo, MAGL-3, MA-15, or Vlinder.

Geography and geomorphology

Regional 

The Western Pacific Ocean contains a large number of mountains, including underwater guyots and emergent atolls and volcanic islands, all of which appear to originate from volcanic processes. The guyot lies between Guam and Wake Island and is part of the northwestern Magellan Seamounts; the Magellan Seamounts include Pako Guyot, Ioah Guyot and Ita Mai Tai. These seamounts appear to relate to hotspot volcanism although the age progression is not perfectly linear and there are discrepancies to other Pacific Ocean hotspots such as the Musicians Seamounts. Vlinder Guyot lies close to the Ogasawara Fracture Zone and this fracture zone may have influenced the development of the guyot; Pako Guyot is located southeast of Vlinder.

Local 

The volcanic cones form an irregular group of cones in the northeastern corner of the summit platform and they feature reefal deposits. The slopes of Vlinder Guyot feature benches and terraces as well as rectilinear grabens; one such graben coincides with the young cones. 

The two eastern protrusions feature additional seamounts, especially the south-southeastern one where Oma Vlinder seamount lies. This centre appears to be older and apparently never rose above sea level, it is now located about  deeper.

The seafloor under Vlinder is 155-190 million years old. Remotely operated vehicle observations have found that the slopes of Vlinder Guyot are covered by sand and rocks. The sand is probably derived from pelagic sediments and also from the summit platform, while the rocks appear to be of both sedimentary and volcanic origin and are often covered by manganese crusts.

Composition 

Vlinder Guyot has erupted alkali basalt, basanite and hawaiite containing hornblende and plagioclase, oceanite, tholeiite and trachybasalt, while Oma Vlinder has erupted hawaiite. Isotope data show some affinity to rocks recovered at Pitcairn and Rarotonga.

Presumably, tholeiites form the base of the seamount and alkaline-subalkaline rocks its summit, while basanites occur in the secondary cones. Meanwhile, sediments such as limestone and silt and ferromanganese crusts cover the summit plateau. Weathering of volcanic rocks has produced iddingsite and palagonite, with calcite, chlorite and phyllipsite.

Geologic history 

Based on argon-argon dating, the northwestern edifice appears to be 102.4 - 100.2 million years old while the various dates obtained on samples from Vlinder and Oma Vlinder cluster around 95.1 ± 0.5 million years ago. Oma Vlinder and the main Vlinder Guyot appear to have the same ages and drowned at the same time, while the post-erosional cone is about 20-30 million years younger than Vlinder. The northwestern volcanic centre is too old to have been formed by the Magellan hotspot, while the post-erosional cone may relate to the Samoa hotspot that passed close to Vlinder Guyot between 75 - 65 million years ago or to plate tectonic processes. Miocene volcanic rocks have been found as well, and Cretaceous clays have been reported.

During the Aptian to Turonian, limestone deposits formed on Vlinder Guyot which are recognizable on the rift zones, Oma Vlinder and in parts of the main guyot. These limestones formed in lagoon and reef environments and contain fossils of bivalves, bryozoans, corals, echinoderms, foraminifera, gastropods, molluscs and rudists; rudists and corals were among the most important reef builders when at the time Vlinder Guyot was an atoll. Its drowning commenced in the Albian to Cenomanian times although evidence of continued emergence exists until the Paleocene; shallow areas may have been formed by late-stage volcanic eruptions that formed new cones on the flat top; they may have been emplaced on reefs and above sea level. The youngest volcanic rocks are 15 ± 2 million years old.

Present-day ecosystem 

The slopes of Vlinder Guyot are settled by bamboo corals, brittle stars, few coral colonies, feather stars, fish, glass sponges, octocorals, sea cucumbers, sea lilies, sea stars, shrimp and squat lobsters. Animals are particularly common in the more rocky areas. Among fish, cusk eels and cutthroat eels have been found.

Human exploitation 

The guyot is located within the area of the Pacific Remote Islands Marine National Monument but also within an area leased to the Russian Federation by the International Seabed Authority for cobalt-rich ferromanganese exploration. The guyot has been researched for potential impacts of mining on its ecosystem.

References

Sources

External links 
 NOAA

Seamounts of the Pacific Ocean
Cretaceous volcanoes
Miocene volcanism